Ricla is a municipality located in the province of Zaragoza, Aragon, Spain. According to the 2004 census (INE), the municipality has a population of 2,653 inhabitants.

See also

Valdejalón
List of municipalities in Zaragoza

References

External links

Ricla site

Municipalities in the Province of Zaragoza